Joseph Leonard O'Brien (November 10, 1895 – June 18, 1973) was a Canadian politician and businessman. Born in South Nelson, New Brunswick, he was a member of the Legislative Assembly of New Brunswick from 1925 to 1930 and was Speaker of the Assembly. By profession he was a lumber merchant, operating a small sawmill in South Nelson.

In 1940, he was elected to the House of Commons of Canada for the riding of Northumberland. A member of the National Government, he was defeated in 1945. In 1958, he was appointed the 21st Lieutenant Governor of New Brunswick and served until 1965.

He purchased Beaubears Island, New Brunswick in 1920 for the sum of $1.00.  A monument stands in the national park on the island in his honour.

His remains rest at Malcolm Cemetery of St. Patrick's Church located in Nelson-Miramichi, Miramichi, New Brunswick, Canada.

References

1895 births
1973 deaths
Businesspeople from New Brunswick
Canadian businesspeople in timber
Lieutenant Governors of New Brunswick
Conservative Party of Canada (1867–1942) MPs
Members of the House of Commons of Canada from New Brunswick
Speakers of the Legislative Assembly of New Brunswick
People from Miramichi, New Brunswick
Progressive Conservative Party of New Brunswick MLAs